The following is a list of major league baseball umpires. The list includes umpires who worked in any of four 19th century major leagues (American Association, National Association, Players' League, Union Association), one defunct 20th century major league (Federal League), the currently active Major League Baseball, or either of its leagues (American League, National League) when they maintained separate umpiring staffs.



Major League umpires

Key

 denotes umpires who were former major league players
 denotes umpires who were active players (emergency substitutes)

A

B

C

D

E

F

G

H

I

J

K

L

M

N

O

P

Q

R

S

T

U

V

W

X
None

Y

Z

References

External links

 All-time umpire roster via MLB.com
 Complete list of MLB umpires via Retrosheet
 Umpire cards from Sporting News via Retrosheet

Umpires
List
Major League Baseball